Cyclopentaphosphine is the inorganic compound with the formula (PH)5.  It is prepared by the hydrolysis of cyclo-[PSiMe3]4 (Me = methyl).  Although only of theoretical interest, (PH)5 is parent of many related cyclic polyphosphines that are the subject of research.

Organic cyclophosphines

Organic cyclophosphanes are a family of organophosphorus compounds with the formula (RP)n where R is an organic substituent.  Many examples are known.  They are white, air-sensitive solids with have good solubility in organic solvents.  Well-characterized examples are known for ring sizes 3–6.  The three-membered rings feature bulky substituents, e.g., [tert-BuP]3.  

The cyclophosphines can be prepared by several methods, one involves reductive coupling of dichlorophosphines:
5PhPCl2  +  5 Mg  →  [PhP]5  +  5MgCl2

Isomerism
The structures are complicated by the slow pyramidal inversion at phosphorus(III).  In principle, many isomers are possible for cyclo-P5R5, but usually only one is observed.  All phenyl substituents are equatorial in cyclo-P6(C6H5)6.

References

Phosphines
Cyclic compounds
Five-membered rings